Chen Shuxia (born in 1963, Wenzhou, Zhejiang, China), is a Chinese contemporary artist. Chen graduated from Central Academy of Fine Arts, Beijing (CAFA) with a degree in folk arts in 1987. She is currently an Associate Professor of Art Education Department at Central Academy of Fine Arts, Beijing, China.

Chen's work has been exhibited in several key galleries, including the Beijing Tokyo Art Projects and the Soka Art Center, Taipei. Chen's artwork has also been auctioned several times, with price ranging from eight thousand dollars to twenty-five thousand dollars.

In 2011, Vibration was sold at Ravenel, Taipei, marking the record price (25,120 US dollars) of Chen's artwork at auction.

Exhibitions

Solo exhibitions 

2009 "How Far Apart", He Xiangning Museum, Shenzhen, China 
2006 "Virtual and Real" National Art Museum of China, Beijing
2005 "Primitive Colors" Sunshine Art, Hangzhou
2004 "Chen Shuxia Solo Exhibition", PYO Gallery, Seoul

Group exhibitions 
2007 "Red Hills and Blue Water - Touring Exhibition of Works by Contemporary Sino-German Artists", Lubecker Art Gallery, Germany
2006 Vanity and Reality - Rediscovery of Asian Contemporary Art, Culture space of Seoul Heyri Art Fund, Seoul
2005 "Nature and Human - The 2nd Contemporary Chinese Oil Painting Landscape Exhibition", National Art Museum of China, Beijing
2003 "China New Physical Oil Painting Exhibition", Shanghai Liu Haisu Art Museum, Shanghai

Award 
In 1991, Chen's work Pink Flower won Silver Medal in the 1st China annual Oil Painting Exhibition in Hong Kong

References 

1963 births
Chinese contemporary artists
Living people